Kirby is a surname. Kirby is found in 116 governed bodies in the world, though is most concentrated in the USA (70,753), England (22,162), Australia (7,160), Canada (5,268), and Ireland (1,931), but most prevalent in Saint Vincent and the Grenadines (1:1,127). This shows the people with this surname have travelled and become residents in many nations around the world. It originated in Northern England or in Southwestern Ireland from the Old Norse word "kirkja" + "býr" meaning "church" + "settlement".

Notable people with the surname include:

 Abner Kirby (1818–1893), mayor of Milwaukee, Wisconsin
 Adam Kirby (born 1980s), jockey
 Alan Kirby (born 1977), Irish former footballer
 Alex Kirby (disambiguation)
 Alister Kirby (1886–1917), British rower who competed in the 1912 Summer Olympics
 Andy Kirby (1961–2002), stock car driver and motorcycle racer
 Bill Kirby (born 1975), Australian swimmer
  Brandon Kirby (born 1991), American Real Estate Agent and businessman
 Bruce Kirby (disambiguation)
 Bruno Kirby (1949–2006), American film and television actor
 Cam Kirby (1909–2003), Canadian politician
 Cecil Kirby (born 1950), Canadian outlaw biker and criminal.
 Charles Kirk Kirby (1826–1910), American architect
 Chauncey Kirby, Canadian ice hockey player
 Claire Kirby (born 1987), New Zealand beauty queen
 Clay Kirby (1948–1991), Major League Baseball pitcher
 Connor Kirby (born 1998), English football player
 Dale Kirby (born 1971), Canadian politician
 David Kirby (disambiguation)
 David Kirby (journalist), journalist
 David Kirby (judge) (born 1943), judge of the Supreme Court of New South Wales
 David Kirby (poet) (born 1944), American poet
 Dean Kirby, American politician
 Dorothy Kirby, American professional golfer and sportscaster
 Doug Kirby (born 1957), American author
 Douglas Kirby (1943–2012), research scientist
 Durward Kirby (1912–2000), television personality
 Edmund Kirby (1838–1920), English architect
 Edward Kirby (1901–1968), American athlete
 Edward M. Kirby (1906-1974), American public relations manager and US Army colonel
 Eric Kirby (footballer) (born 1926), English professional footballer
 Fran Kirby (born 1993), English footballer
 Frank E. Kirby (1849–1929), Detroit designer of steamships in the early 20th century
 Frank Howard Kirby (1871–1956), British soldier
 Frank Kirby (disambiguation)
 Fred Kirby (1910–1996), American country-and-western recording and performance artist and songwriter
 Gary Kirby (born 1967), Irish hurling manager and former player
 Gene Kirby (?–2011), American Major League Baseball announcer and front office executive
 George Kirby (1923–1995), comedian
 George Kirby (baseball) (born 1998), Major League Baseball pitcher
 Gerald Kirby (disambiguation)
 Gustavus Town Kirby (1874–1956), American lawyer
 Halder Kirby, Canadian ice hockey player
 Harold Kirby (zoologist) (1900–1952), Canadian-American zoologist and protistologist
 Harold James Kirby (1895–1956), lawyer, real estate agent, and political figure in Ontario
 Henry Kirby (1889–1976), English cricketer
 Jack Kirby (1917–1994), comic book artist
 Jake Kirby (born 1994), English football midfielder
 James Kirby (died 1915), American labor leader
 Jane Kirby, Canadian figure skater
 Jay Kirby (1920–1964), American actor
 Jim Kirby (1884–1971), inventor
 John Henry Kirby (1860–1940), American businessman
 John Joshua Kirby (1716–1774), British landscape painter, engraver, and writer
 John Kirby (artist) (born 1949), British painter
 John Kirby (attorney), US attorney involved in some famous trials
 John Kirby (Canadian politician) (1772–1846), Canadian businessman and politician
 John Kirby (disambiguation)
 Jon Luke Kirby (born 1998), English rugby league player
 Josh Kirby (1928–2001), British illustrator known for his Discworld covers
 Joshua Kirby (1716–1774), British artist
 Kathy Kirby (1938–2011), British singer
 Kayle Kirby (born 1998), professional Australian rules footballer
 Ken Kirby, Canadian-born actor and screenwriter
 Kenneth Kirby, South African chess master
 Kier M. Kirby, singer of Deee-Lite
 Lee-Ann Kirby (born 1987), Trinidad and Tobago cricketer
 Leyland Kirby, English electronic musician
 Louis Kirby (1928–2006), British newspaper editor
 Luke Kirby (actor), Canadian film actor
 Luke Kirby (priest) (1540s–1582), Catholic Priest and martyr
 Micajah W. Kirby (1798–1882), New York politician
 Michael J. L. Kirby (born 1941), former Canadian senator and current Chair of the Mental Health Commission of Canada
 Michael Kirby (judge) (born 1939), Justice of the High Court of Australia
 Paul Kirby (born 1966), Australian politician
 Pauline Kirby (1905–1981), American army nurse
 Rene Kirby (born 1955), American male actor
 Richard Kirby (arbitrator) (1904–2001), Australian arbitrator
 Robert Kirby (musician) (1948–2009), British-born arranger of string sections for rock and folk music
 Robert Kirby (cartoonist) (born 1962), American cartoonist
 Robion Kirby (born 1938), American mathematician
 Roger Kirby (born 1950), British urologist and surgeon
 Rome Kirby, American sailor
 Ryan Kirby (born 1974), English soccer player
 Sandra Kirby (born 1949), Canadian academic and rower
 Steve Kirby (cricketer), English cricketer
 Steve T. Kirby (born 1952), Lieutenant Governor of South Dakota
 Stuart Kirby (born 1981), race car driver
 Sylvia Kirby (born 1956), American country singer
 Vanessa Kirby (born 1989), English actress
 Wallace W. Kirby (1881–1962), Director of the Bureau of Engraving and Printing
 Wayne Kirby (born 1964), American baseball player and coach
 Will Kirby (born 1973), Big Brother contestant
 William C. Kirby (born 1950), Historian at Harvard University
 William F. Kirby (1867–1934), Senator from Arkansas
 William Forsell Kirby (1844–1912), later English entomologist
 William Kirby (author), Canadian author of The Golden Dog, etc.
 William Kirby (entomologist) (1759–1850), English entomologist

Fictional characters
Paul Kirby, a character in the 2001 American science fiction movie Jurassic Park III

See also
 Justice Kirby (disambiguation)
 Eóganachta
 Eóganacht Áine
 Kirby (disambiguation)

References

English-language surnames
English toponymic surnames